Metkel Eyob (born 4 September 1993) is an Eritrean cyclist, who currently rides for UCI Continental team .

Major results

2013
 3rd Overall Tour du Rwanda
1st  Mountains classification
1st Stage 6
2014
 1st  Young rider classification Tour do Rio
 10th Overall Mzansi Tour
2015
 KZN Autumn Series
1st Hibiscus Cycle Classic
3rd Mayday Classic
 4th Overall Tour du Rwanda
1st Stage 7 
 6th Time trial, National Road Championships
2016
 2nd Road race, National Road Championships
 2nd Overall Tour du Rwanda
1st Stage 5
 7th Road race, African Road Championships
2017
 2nd Overall Tour du Rwanda
1st Stages 4 & 6
 9th Overall Tour de Hongrie
2018
 African Road Championships
1st  Team time trial
2nd  Road race
 1st Stage 1 Tour de Lombok Mandalika
 2nd Overall Tour de Filipinas
1st  Mountains classification
1st Stage 4
 3rd Road race, National Road Championships
2019
 3rd Overall Tour of Peninsular
 5th Road race, National Road Championships
 6th Overall La Tropicale Amissa Bongo
 6th Overall Tour de Indonesia
1st Stage 4
 9th Overall Tour of Almaty
2021
 2nd Grand Prix Gündoğmuş
 2nd Kahramanmaraş Grand Prix Road Race
 3rd Road race, National Road Championships
 3rd Grand Prix Velo Alanya
 3rd Grand Prix Kayseri
 3rd Grand Prix Develi
 6th Overall Tour of Mevlana
 9th Grand Prix Erciyes
2022
 2nd Grand Prix Gündoğmuş
 4th Overall Tour of Thailand
 6th Grand Prix Mediterranean
 10th Overall Tour of Antalya
2023
 6th Overall Tour of Sharjah

References

External links

1993 births
Living people
Eritrean male cyclists
Sportspeople from Asmara